The State of Uttar Pradesh v. Raj Narain (1975 AIR 865, 1975 SCR (3) 333) was a 1975 case heard by the Allahabad High Court that found the Prime Minister of India Indira Gandhi guilty of electoral malpractices. The ruling on the case that had been filed by the defeated opposition candidate, Raj Narain, Justice Jagmohanlal Sinha invalidated Gandhi's win and barred her from holding elected office for six years. The decision caused a political crisis in India that led to the imposition of a state of emergency by Gandhi's government from 1975 to 1977.

Facts

Raj Narain had contested the 1971 Indian general election against Indira Gandhi, who represented the constituency of Rae Bareilly in the Lok Sabha, the lower house of the Indian Parliament. Gandhi was re-elected from Rae Bareilly by a two-to-one margin of the popular vote, and her Indian National Congress (R) party won a sweeping majority in the Indian Parliament. Narain filed a petition to appeal the verdict, alleging that Indira Gandhi used bribery, government machinery and resources to gain an unfair advantage in contesting the election. Narain specifically charged Gandhi of using government employees as election agents and of organising campaign activities in the constituency while still on the payroll of the government.

Gandhi was represented by Nanabhoy Palkhivala, Raj Narayan by Shanti Bhushan. After she imposed a state of emergency on 26 June-1975, Palkhivala resigned as her lawyer to protest against the decision. When the Janata Party came to power in 1977, Palkhiwala was appointed Ambassador to US. Shanti Bhushan became a minister in the Janata Party government.

Judgement
On 12 June 1975, Justice Jagmohanlal Sinha found Gandhi guilty of electoral malpractices. Sinha declared the election verdict in the Rae Bareilly constituency "null and void", and barred Gandhi from holding elected office for six years. While Sinha had dismissed charges of bribery, he had found Indira guilty of misusing government machinery as a government employee herself. The court order gave the Congress (R) twenty days to make arrangements to replace Gandhi in her official posts. This was unprecedented. Its impact finally led to the fall of Congress regime at the centre immediately after emergency. Raj Narain became a national hero for overthrowing Gandhi's and the Congress's regime after 30 years of independence, initially by trouncing Gandhi in judicial battle and later in 1977 Loksabha elections. This fulfilled an unrealised dream of his friend and mentor Ram Manohar Lohia. Gandhi appealed the verdict to the Supreme Court of India, which granted a conditional stay of execution on the ruling on 24 June 1976. On 7 November 1976, the Supreme Court of India formally overturned the conviction.

Significance
The Times of India compared the verdict to "firing the Prime Minister for a traffic ticket". The Congress (R) also staged numerous protests across the country in support of Gandhi. However, the verdict helped galvanize the opposition political parties, who demanded that Indira Gandhi resign from office immediately. Jayaprakash Narayan, the leader of the Janata Morcha, a coalition of opposition political parties, called for a campaign of civil disobedience to oust Indira's government. On 25 June 1975, a state of emergency was declared by the President of India, Fakhruddin Ali Ahmed, upon the advice of Prime Minister Gandhi. The government argued that the political disorder was a threat to national security. Using the sweeping powers granted by the emergency decree, thousands of opposition leaders and activists were arrested, press censorship was introduced and elections were postponed. During this period, Gandhi's Congress (R) used its parliamentary majority to amend the Indian Constitution and overwrite the law that she had been found guilty of violating. When the government finally called elections in 1977, the opposition Janata Party alliance defeated Gandhi's Congress (R) party. Raj Narain defeated Indira Gandhi in the Rae Bareilly constituency by a margin of 55,200 votes.

References

Legal history of India
The Emergency (India)
1975 in India
Election law in India
1975 in case law
Indian case law
Indira Gandhi administration
High Courts of India cases
Allahabad High Court